Law of the Underworld is a 1938 American drama film directed by Lew Landers and written by Bert Granet and Edmund L. Hartmann. The film stars Chester Morris, Anne Shirley, Eduardo Ciannelli, Walter Abel and Richard Bond. The film was released on May 6, 1938, by RKO Pictures.

Plot
A respected citizen with secret ties to the local mob is faced with revealing his criminal connections to save two innocent people from execution.

Cast 
Chester Morris as Gene Fillmore
Anne Shirley as Annabelle Porter
Eduardo Ciannelli as Rocky
Walter Abel as Warren Rogers
Richard Bond as Tommy Brown
Lee Patrick as Dorothy Palmer
Paul Guilfoyle as Batsy
Frank M. Thomas as Police Captain Gargan
Eddie Acuff as Bill
Vinton Hayworth as Eddie 
Jack Carson as Johnny
Paul Stanton as Barton

References

External links 
 

1938 films
American black-and-white films
RKO Pictures films
Films directed by Lew Landers
1938 drama films
Films scored by Nathaniel Shilkret
Films scored by Roy Webb
American drama films
1930s English-language films
1930s American films